The Embassy of the Republic of Uganda in Washington, D.C. is the diplomatic mission of the Republic of Uganda to the United States. It is located at 5911 16th Street Northwest, Washington, D.C.

See also
Uganda – United States relations

References

External links
Official website

Uganda
Washington, D.C.
Uganda–United States relations